Miguel D'Agostino (born 1 January 1972) is a former professional football player and current coach. He played as a defender. He was most recently first team coach at PSG.

Club career
Born in Argentina, D'Agostino began his playing career at local side Patronato, before moving to Newell's Old Boys in 1990. D'Agostino played alongside Mauricio Pochettino in Newell's defence before moving to Spain in 1994. Miguel then had a spell playing with Gimnasia Jujuy before moving to Ecuadorian club L.D.U. Quito.
From there, he joined Chilean club CD Palestino, before following in Pochettino's footsteps and heading to play in Spain with SD Compostela. The duo moved to France in 2000, with Pochettino joining Paris Saint-Germain and D'Agostino joining Chamois Niortais.

Coaching career
In the summer 2002, D'Agostino went on to play for Canet-en-Rousillon and then joined Angoulême CFC as a player-assistant. Between 2003 and 2007, he worked as an assistant manager for Stade Brestois 29. Next D'Agostino spent 2007-08 as assistant coach at Dubai CSC in the United Arab Emirates before returning to Brest as chief scout.

Following Pochettino's appointment at Espanyol in January 2009, D'Agostino also did some scouting on behalf of his former teammate, Mauricio Pochettino, before moving to Spain on a permanent basis in 2011. The duo left Espanyol in January 2013 and was hired by Southampton. In May 2014, Pochettino was appointed manager of Tottenham Hotspur and took his staff with him, including D'Agostino. On 19 November 2019, Pochettino and his staff were fired. On 2 January 2021, Mauricio Pochettino was appointed as the head coach of Paris Saint-Germain, D'Agostino joined him as assistant.

References

External links
Miguel D'Agostino profile at chamoisfc79.fr

1972 births
Living people
Argentine footballers
Argentine expatriate footballers
Association football defenders
Chamois Niortais F.C. players
Newell's Old Boys footballers
Gimnasia y Esgrima de Jujuy footballers
SD Compostela footballers
Angoulême Charente FC players
L.D.U. Quito footballers
Club Deportivo Palestino footballers
Ligue 2 players
Chilean Primera División players
Expatriate footballers in Chile
Expatriate footballers in Spain
Expatriate footballers in France
Southampton F.C. non-playing staff
Tottenham Hotspur F.C. non-playing staff
Paris Saint-Germain F.C. non-playing staff
People from Paraná, Entre Ríos
Sportspeople from Entre Ríos Province